Poison Ivy: The New Seduction is a 1997 American direct-to-video erotic thriller drama film directed by Kurt Voss and stars Jaime Pressly. It is a sequel to the 1996 film Poison Ivy II: Lily and the third installment of the Poison Ivy film series.

Plot
In 1985, Ivan and Catherine Greer live with their 9-year-old daughter, Joy, their housekeeper, Rebecca, whom Ivan is having an affair with and her two daughters, Ivy, 9 and Violet, 8. The three young girls live as sisters, but the more rambunctious Ivy is bored by their childish games and rejoices at Ivan's unexpected early day return from the office, saying, "There's going to be fireworks".

Ivan catches Rebecca in bed with the handsome pool boy, and the two men scuffle. As Ivan tends to his wounds, he and Rebecca begin a loud argument which is overheard by Catherine in the garden. Upon learning of the affair, she immediately evicts Rebecca and her children.

In 1996, Violet; who is now a beautiful young woman returns to the Greer home and is reunited with Joy. Violet states that she is looking for a summer time residence while working as a waitress and is planning to attend the local junior college. Joy suggests that she reside with them and stay in the late Catherine's room. Joy is an amateur tennis star and engaged to her boyfriend from Yale University, Michael, who will be working as an intern for Joy's father's bank.

During a late night party, Violet feels isolated and ridiculed by Joy's Ivy League friends, and excuses herself for late shift work. Afterward, Michael takes Joy to her room and initiates foreplay, only to be rejected. As Michael is on his way out, he runs into Violet, who is dressed in a sadomasochistic costume. Violet states that the two have gotten off on the wrong foot, and performs oral sex on him.

Violet's obsession with Joy motivates her to destroy all of Joy's other relationships. When her tennis partner, Jaimie, comes over to practice with Joy, Violet spikes their drinks and Joy and Jaimie drunkenly attempt to play tennis, giggling and eventually passing out. Violet then undresses and handcuffs Jaimie, convincing her that the two have just engaged in sex. A horrified Jaimie flees the Greer house.

Michael is Violet's next target. While by the Greer pool, she convinces him Joy has been unfaithful and seduces him while she provides him with cocaine to reignite his former addiction. Michael vows never to see her again.

Ivan is the next to be seduced when Violet swims topless in his pool and dresses in his late wife's clothing. The Greers' housekeeper, Mrs. B, quickly becomes suspicious of Violet and makes enemies with her while attempting to thwart her schemes. She is later killed by Violet when she threatens to throw her out of the house.

Michael confronts Violet while she is walking down the street. He reveals to her that he has lost his internship at the bank because of drugs and that he knows of her schemes. In addition, he not only explains to Violet the history of what happened to her sister Ivy, but also threatens that she must leave the Greers' before he tells Joy the truth. When Michael arrives at the Greers' later that day, Violet knocks him unconscious and injects him with a lethal dose of drugs, killing him.

Joy returns from a failed tennis match distraught at the recent events, only to learn of Michael's death, and walk in on her father and Violet engaged in sadomasochistic activity. As Joy flees, Ivan tells Violet she must leave, to which she accuses him of repeating the abandonment of her mother. She hides the drugs for Ivan's heart condition and places him in the garage fatally poisoning him with carbon monoxide by leaving a car engine running.

Joy returns that same night to discover Mrs. B is also murdered. Violet induces Joy to dress up and play like they did when they were children, where they will commit suicide by drinking poison. Joy violently resists and splashes the poison on Violet's face. Joy races out of the room to the stairway, where she leans on the banister and cries out for help. Violet resumes her attack. Violet is spun around by Joy and begins to lose her balance at the top of the stairs. Joy grasps the end of Violet's pearl necklace to keep her from falling. Joy pleads with Violet to reach out and take her hand. Instead Violet leans her head back; the necklace shatters and Violet's feet slip, causing her to fall backwards down the stairs. Violet lies dead at the bottom of the stairs. Joy calmly exits the mansion and leaves to start a new life elsewhere.

Cast

Release

Home media 
After its initial 1997 VHS release, the film would be re-released onto DVD by New Line Home Entertainment during the late 1990s and 2000s. In 2019, it was released on Blu-ray for the first time, as part of Shout! Factory's The Poison Ivy Collection (1992-2008).

Reception

Critical response
In a June 1997 review for Entertainment Weekly, J.R. Taylor gave the film a D+ rating, and described it as "a dim-bulb remake of the flashy Drew Barrymore original".

References

External links
 
 
 

1997 direct-to-video films
1997 films
1990s teen drama films
1990s erotic thriller films
1990s erotic drama films
1990s thriller drama films
American independent films
American teen drama films
American thriller drama films
Direct-to-video sequel films
Direct-to-video drama films
New Line Cinema direct-to-video films
Films set in 1985
Films set in 1996
American films about revenge
Adultery in films
Direct-to-video erotic thriller films
American erotic thriller films
American erotic drama films
1992 drama films
1992 films
1990s English-language films
Films directed by Kurt Voss
1990s American films